Luis Barruffa (11 February 1946 – 8 February 2021) was a Uruguayan cyclist. He competed in the 1000m time trial at the 1968 Summer Olympics.

References

External links
 

1946 births
2021 deaths
Uruguayan male cyclists
Olympic cyclists of Uruguay
Cyclists at the 1968 Summer Olympics
Sportspeople from Montevideo